Peter Alexander Walsh  (11 March 193510 April 2015) was an Australian senator and Labor politician from 1974 to 1993.

Walsh grew up in Doodlakine, Western Australia, where he was a wheat and sheep farmer. He was elected to the Australian Senate in 1974, and served as Minister for Resources and Energy from 1983 to 1984 and Finance Minister from 1984 to 1990. He was noted for his pro-free market views.

In his 1995 memoirs, Confessions of a Failed Finance Minister, Walsh was critical of his colleagues and of political processes in general for failing to curb what he saw as wasteful government expenditure, and unnecessary government intervention. Also in his book he corrected errors made in Whatever It Takes, the book written by former ministerial colleague and fellow Senator Graham Richardson.

After leaving politics, Walsh was a columnist for the Australian Financial Review and was particularly critical of environmentalism. He was one of the founders of the Lavoisier Group which opposes the Kyoto protocol on global warming. Walsh also expressed criticism over the Rudd government's National Broadband Network scheme.

Walsh died at a hospital in Perth after a short illness on 10 April 2015.

In his tribute to him, sitting Liberal Finance Minister and another WA Senator Mathias Cormann described his predecessor as "a real pillar of the Hawke Government".

Notes

External links
 

1935 births
2015 deaths
Members of the Cabinet of Australia
Members of the Australian Senate for Western Australia
Members of the Australian Senate
Australian Labor Party members of the Parliament of Australia
Officers of the Order of Australia
Australian farmers
People from Kellerberrin, Western Australia
20th-century Australian politicians
Government ministers of Australia